James B. McDougal (August 25, 1940 – March 8, 1998) was a native of White County, Arkansas, and his wife, Susan McDougal (the former Susan Carol Henley), were financial partners with Bill Clinton and Hillary Clinton in the real estate venture that led to the Whitewater political scandal of the 1990s. Starting in 1982, McDougal operated Madison Guaranty Savings and Loan Association.

Political career
McDougal was a Democrat and a former aide to the late U.S. Senator James William Fulbright. He later was a political science professor at Ouachita Baptist University in Arkadelphia.

In 1982, McDougal made a failed bid for the United States House of Representatives against the Republican incumbent John Paul Hammerschmidt in Arkansas's northwesterly Third Congressional District. Hammerschmidt polled 133,909 votes (66 percent) to McDougal's 69,089 (34 percent). Clinton himself had been defeated by Hammerschmidt in the same district in 1974. McDougal entered the political arena again at the height of the Whitewater controversy, running in the 1994 Democratic Primary in Arkansas' Fourth Congressional District, in South Arkansas. McDougal ran last in a three-man race, getting 23% of the vote in a primary won by State Senator Jay Bradford of Pine Bluff, who, in turn, lost the general election to a first-term representative, Republican Jay Dickey in 1994's "Battle of the Jays".

Legal issues
On April 14, 1997, he was convicted of 18 felony counts of fraud and conspiracy charges. The counts had to do with bad loans made by Madison in the late 1980s. As his savings and loan was federally insured, the $68 million was paid by taxpayers. During the case, special prosecutor Ken Starr requested a reduced sentence because of McDougal's assistance in the investigation.

He joined with his wife, who later divorced him, and the Clintons to borrow $203,000 to buy land in the Ozark Mountains for vacation homes.  When the development failed, he attempted to cover the losses with savings-and-loan funds. Prosecuted for fraud in 1984, he hired the Rose Law Firm, which had Hillary Clinton as a partner, to defend him.

McDougal held a fundraiser, which paid off Bill Clinton's campaign debt of $50,000. Madison cashier's checks accounted for $12,000 of the funds that were raised.

McDougal was also found by federal regulators to have made fraudulent loans with regard to his Castle Grande project, a real estate development 10 minutes south of Little Rock. The project was a  lot on which he hoped to build microbrewery, shopping center, a trailer park, and other future projects in 1985. The sale price was $1.75 million. Since state regulations prohibited him from investing more than 6% of his savings-and-loan assets in the project, he put in $600,000 of Madison Guaranty money and had Seth Ward put in the difference, which was $1.15 million. Ward lent the money from Madison Guaranty as a non-recourse loan.

Death
McDougal died of a myocardial infarction at the Federal Correctional Facility in Fort Worth, Texas, aged 57.

References

External links
Washington Post time line
CNN whitewater report
CNN report
Caught In The Whitewater - CBS
CNN Report: McDougal had no access to his heart medication nor doctors just before his death
 Hickman Ewing reduced Jim McDougal's prison sentence in exchange for testimony that Susan McDougal refused to confirm.
Rose Law Firm Billing Records, PBS, WGBH educational foundation, Frontline
Labaton, Stephen. "Appraiser on Madison Loans in Plea Accord", New York Times, December 6, 1994
Snopes.com on Jim McDougal's death

1940 births
1998 deaths
American fraudsters
American white-collar criminals
American real estate businesspeople
American people who died in prison custody
Arkansas Democrats
People from White County, Arkansas
Prisoners who died in United States federal government detention
American businesspeople convicted of crimes
Businesspeople from Arkansas
Whitewater controversy
Bill Clinton